It Was Always Me is a Colombian mystery-drama streaming television series, which is produced by The Mediapro Studio for The Walt Disney Company. In Spain and Latin America (except Brazil), the series was released on Disney+ on June 15, 2022.

The series has been renewed for a second season, which is scheduled for release in 2023.

Plot

Season 1 
In Mexico, the life of journalism student Lupe changes abruptly when she learns that her father, known as "El Faraón" ("The Pharaoh"), has died. In his native Colombia, he had been considered a music legend. As a result, Lupe decides to leave her native Mexico to attend her father's funeral in the Colombian city of Cartagena. Upon her arrival in Colombia, Lupe meets a mysterious young man named Noah, who turns out to have been her late father's assistant. Lupe decides to stay when she begins to suspect that her father's death was not an accident after all. She enters a music competition to investigate her late father's entourage for more information and clues about his mysterious death. In the process, Lupe must face her greatest fear: singing in public. Together with Noah, Lupe embarks on a musical adventure full of danger, mystery, intrigue, and romance. Lupe can't trust anyone, however, not even Noah, and after a long road with many false turns, she discovers the truth hidden in the heart of Colombia's Caribbean region.

Season 2 
Three years after the TV broadcast of the contest show "Lucas Martin Presenta: El camino del Faraón", the former contestants are reuniting to record a reunion album on Pipe's private island. Pipe is now one of the most famous rock stars in Colombia. But not only his life has changed drastically, but also that of the others: Lupe, for example, has her center of life in Mexico, where she pursues her vocation as a journalist; Noah, on the other hand, ekes out an existence in a bar he inherited from his family in Colombia. So the reunion album offers the perfect opportunity to get closer again. But the reunion is marred when a valuable necklace given to Lupe by "El Faraón" is stolen on the first night. Little by little, hidden secrets and uncomfortable truths come to light in mysterious and puzzling ways that not only cause tension between the old friends, but also threaten to leave their lives, built up over the years, in tatters.

Cast 
 Karol Sevilla as María Guadalupe „Lupe“ del Mar Díaz Mint
 Pipe Bueno as	Noah Cortez
 Christian Tappan as Silvestre „El Faraón“ Díaz
 José Julián Gaviria as Felipe „Pipe“ Díaz
 Simón Savi as	Charly Fabián
 Antonio Sanint as	Lucas Martin
 Adriana Romero as	Wendy Núñez
 Juliana Velásquez as Angie Rueda
 Dubán Prado as Samuel „Sammy“ García Herrera
 Alejandro Gutiérrez as Kevin Cepeda
 Katherine Escobar as Mercedes Cepeda
 Eliana Raventós as Lucía Ibarra
 Marisol Correa as	Cecilia Mint
 Felipe Botero as Ariel Rozo
 Esther Sanz as Sofía
 Melanie Dell´olmo	as Zoe
 Juan David Penagos as Fran		
 Eduardo Pérez as Benjamín

Episodes

Series overview

Season 1 (2022)

Season 2 (2023)

Production

Background
In March 2020, it was reported that Disney+ had commissioned the musical thriller series It Was Always Me created and directed by Felipe Cano, with Leonardo Aranguibel and Cecilia Mendonça as producers.

The show was originally planned to star Tini Stoessel and Sebastian Yatra, but following their breakup they were replaced by Karol Sevilla and Pipe Bueno and the plot of the series was completely modified.

Filming
Filming of the series began in March 2021 in Cartagena and Bogotá and ended in May in Península de Barú.

References

External links 
 
 

2020s drama television series
Television shows filmed in Colombia
2020s Colombian television series
Spanish-language television shows
Disney+ original programming